The 1992–93 San Jose Sharks season was the team's second in the NHL. They set league records for most losses in a season with 71 losses, and most consecutive losses, with 17 in a row. Their worst defeat of the season was a 13-1 loss to the Calgary Flames, a game where after the Sharks scored first, the Flames countered by scoring 13 unanswered goals.

The team had recorded its first shutout, attained by rookie goaltender Arturs Irbe, and Rob Gaudreau scored the first hat-trick in franchise history. Head coach George Kingston, the first head coach in the history of the Sharks, was fired following this tumultuous season and replaced by Kevin Constantine. It was the last season the Sharks played in the Cow Palace in Daly City.

Offseason
The Sharks chose Mike Rathje with their first-round pick in the entry draft, third overall.

Regular season
The Sharks allowed the most goals (414) and most even-strength goals (286) of all 24 teams during the regular season. They were also shut out a league-high 6 times and tied the Edmonton Oilers and Ottawa Senators for the fewest power-play goals scored, with 66.

On Tuesday, November 17, 1992, Arturs Irbe recorded the first shutout in Sharks history, as San Jose blanked the Los Angeles Kings 6-0 at home.

On Thursday, December 3, 1992, in a 7-5 home loss against the Hartford Whalers, Rob Gaudreau scored the first hat trick in Sharks history. In that same game, Kelly Kisio and Johan Garpenlov each recorded 4 points (1 goal, 3 assists).

In 2004, ESPN ranked the 1992-93 Sharks as the sixth worst team in the first 25 years of the ESPN era.

Season standings

Schedule and results

Player statistics

Forwards
Note: GP= Games played; G= Goals; AST= Assists; PTS = Points; PIM = Points

Defensemen
Note: GP= Games played; G= Goals; AST= Assists; PTS = Points; PIM = Points

Goaltending
Note: GP= Games played; W= Wins; L= Losses; T = Ties; SO = Shutouts; GAA = Goals Against

Awards and records

Transactions

Trades

Free agency

Waivers

Released

Draft picks

NHL Entry Draft

NHL Supplemental Draft

References
 2021–22 San Jose Sharks Media Guide
 Sharks' 1992-1993 Roster
 The Internet Hockey Database

San Jose Sharks season, 1992-93
San Jose Sharks seasons
San Jose
San Jose Sharks
San Jose Sharks